This article lists Presidents of the French Parliament or, as the case may be, of its lower chamber.

The National Constituent Assembly was created in 1789 out of the Estates-General. It, and the revolutionary legislative assemblies that followed – the Legislative Assembly (1791–1792) and the National Convention (1792–1795), had a quickly rotating Presidency. With the establishment of the Directory in 1795, there were two chambers of the French legislature. The lower, the Council of Five Hundred, also had a quickly rotating chairmanship. Under Napoleon I, the Legislative Corps had all authority to actually enact laws, but was essentially a rubberstamp body, lacking the power to debate legislation. With the restoration of the monarchy, a bicameral system was restored, with a Chamber of Peers and a Chamber of Deputies. The Chamber of Deputies, for the first time, had presidents elected for a substantial period of time.

With the revolution of 1848, the monarchical assemblies were dissolved and replaced again with a unicameral National Assembly, which Napoleon III replaced with a new version of his uncle's Legislative Corps. With the establishment of the Third Republic, the name of Chamber of Deputies was restored; after 1876 it was joined by a Senate as upper house. The Chamber of Deputies was renamed the National Assembly in the constitution of the Fourth Republic, and is still known as that.

Presidents of the National Constituent Assembly (1789–1791)

Presidents of the National Constituent Assembly rotated in short periods.

Presidents of the Legislative Assembly (1791–1792)

Presidents of the Legislative Assembly rotated in short periods.

Presidents of the National Convention (1792–1795)
Bold indicates second term as President.

CoPS refers to Committee of Public Safety

CoGS refers to Committee of General Security

Presidents of the Council of Five Hundred (1795–1799)

Presidents of the Legislative Corps (1800–1814)

President of the Chamber of Départements' Deputies (1814–1815)

President of the Chamber of Representatives (4 June – 13 July 1815)

Presidents of the Chamber of Deputies of the Departments (1815–1830)

Presidents of the Chamber of Deputies (1830–1848)

Presidents of the National Constituent Assembly (1848–1849)

President of the National Legislative Assembly (1849–1852)

Presidents of the Legislative Corps (1852–1870)

Presidents of the Chamber of Deputies (1871–1940)

President of the Consultative Assembly (1943–1945)

Presidents of the Constituent National Assembly (1945–1946)

Presidents of the National Assembly, Fourth Republic (1946–1958)

Presidents of the National Assembly, Fifth Republic (1958–present)

External links
 (in French) List of presidents of the National Assembly of France on its official website

France, National Assembly, President
Legislatures of the National Assembly (France)
Presidents
France politics-related lists